Roosevelt Ross Barbour (September 15, 1901 – April 29, 1993) was a Canadian politician. He represented the electoral district of Bonavista South in the Newfoundland and Labrador House of Assembly from 1959 to 1971. He was a member of the Liberal Party of Newfoundland and Labrador. Born in Newtown, Newfoundland and Labrador, he was a salesman.

References

1901 births
1993 deaths
Liberal Party of Newfoundland and Labrador MHAs